Ranitomeya is a genus of dart poison frogs found in Panama and South America south to Peru and Brazil, possibly into Bolivia.

Taxonomy
In 2006 Grant et al. revised the systematics of poison dart frogs and placed many species formerly classified in the genera Dendrobates, Minyobates and Phyllobates in Ranitomeya. In 2011 Brown and colleagues, following other scientists who assumed the existence of two distinct clades in Ranitomeya, erected the genus Andinobates for 12 species of Ranitomeya.

Ranitomeya and Andinobates frogs can be distinguished from those in genera such as Dendrobates in that they are generally smaller, have more than two colors, and seem to glitter if viewed from certain angles. Ranitomeya is widespread in the Amazon basin, whereas Andinobates species are found only in the northern Andes down to Central America.

Description
Also the throat has distinctive color, usually yellow, orange or red. Dorsal skin is smooth or weakly granular. The head is narrower than the body. Fingers and toes bear discs, with those on the fingers being large. Some species, such as R. Variabilis, in the genus exhibit tadpoles transport and cannibalistic behavior.

Threats
Many Ranitomeya species are threatened by habitat loss and collection for the pet trade.

Species 
There are 16 Ranitomeya species:

Dendrobates rubrocephalus Schulte, 1999 is placed here Incertae Sedis.

References

 
Poison dart frogs
Amphibians of Central America
Amphibians of South America
Species endangered by the pet trade
Amphibian genera